Jesselyn (born 1980) is a Dutch DJ who began to play in 2001. Impressed by the techniques of other trance and hard-trance DJs, she started to learn and improve her own abilities. She was able to play at the Frequency Festival in 2002.

Discography
Tonka (2004)
Omnia (2004)
Flora / Fauna (2005)
Contact / Distance (2006)
Iron / Cyrus (2006)
Tank / Celestine (2007)

References

External links

Freaky Music Homepage

1980 births
Living people
Club DJs
Dutch dance musicians
Dutch DJs
People from Veldhoven
Electronic dance music DJs